Pelocoris is a genus of creeping water bugs in the family Naucoridae. There are about 15 described species in Pelocoris.

Species
These 15 species belong to the genus Pelocoris:

 Pelocoris balius La Rivers, 1970
 Pelocoris biimpressus Montandon, 1898
 Pelocoris binotulatus (Stål, 1860)
 Pelocoris bipunctulus (Herrich-Schäffer, 1853)
 Pelocoris carolinensis Torre-Bueno, 1907
 Pelocoris femoratus (Palisot de Beauvois, 1820)
 Pelocoris magister Montandon, 1898
 Pelocoris megistus La Rivers, 1969
 Pelocoris nepaeformis (Fabricius, 1803)
 Pelocoris nitidus Montandon, 1898
 Pelocoris poeyi (Guérin-Ménéville, 1838)
 Pelocoris politus Montandon, 1897
 Pelocoris procurrens White, 1879
 Pelocoris subflavus Montandon, 1898

References

Further reading

External links

 

Naucoridae
Nepomorpha genera
Articles created by Qbugbot